Abdou Samadou Bourou (born 13 October 2000) is a Beninese professional footballer who plays as a defender for Beninese club ASKO Kara and the Benin national team.

References 
 

2000 births
Living people
Beninese footballers
Benin international footballers
Association football defenders
ASKO Kara players